Charles Thomas Vickers (12 February 1891 – 21 June 1917) was a Scottish professional football outside left who played in the Scottish League for Kilmarnock.

Personal life 
Vickers served as a gunner in the Royal Field Artillery during the First World War and died of wounds at 23rd Casualty Clearing Station, Lozinghem on 21 June 1917. He was buried in Lapugnoy Military Cemetery.

Career statistics

References 

Scottish footballers
1917 deaths
British Army personnel of World War I
British military personnel killed in World War I
1891 births
Scottish Football League players
Kilmarnock F.C. players
Footballers from Glasgow
Royal Field Artillery soldiers
Renton F.C. players
Association football outside forwards
People from Gorbals